The list of ship launches in 1777 includes a chronological list of some ships launched in 1777.


References

1777
Ship launches